"Sin Despertar" is a song performed by Chilean band Kudai. It was released as the first single from their debut album Vuelo. This single was also their first single as Kudai, after they gave up their old name band, Ciao. The single was successful in Chile and Argentina and later in the rest of Latin America, including Mexico.

Music video
The music video for the song was filmed in Santiago, Chile at O'Higgins Park, Movistar Arena Santiago. The video was premiered on 24 June 2004 on MTV, and was also shown on Los 10+ Pedidos.

Charts

References 

2004 songs
2004 singles
Kudai songs